Thinking Allowed is a radio discussion programme broadcast on BBC Radio 4 on Wednesday afternoons between 16:00 and 16:30 and repeated between 00:15 and 00:45 on Monday mornings. It focuses on the latest social science research and is hosted by Laurie Taylor, who was formerly a Professor of Sociology at the University of York. The programme was first broadcast in 1998. Occasionally, special editions of the programme are produced in co-operation with the Open University.

References

External links 
 
 Thinking Allowed archive
 Podcast feed

BBC Radio 4 programmes
Educational broadcasting in the United Kingdom
Open University
British podcasts